Procatopus is a genus of poeciliid fishes native to tropical freshwater habitats in Cameroon and Nigeria.

Species
There are currently three recognized species in this genus:
 Procatopus aberrans C. G. E. Ahl, 1927 (Bluegreen lampeye)
 Procatopus nototaenia Boulenger, 1904 (Large finned lampeye)
 Procatopus similis C. G. E. Ahl, 1927 (Variable lampeye)

References

Poeciliidae
Freshwater fish of Africa
Freshwater fish genera
Taxa named by George Albert Boulenger
Ray-finned fish genera